Berlin-Mitte is an electoral constituency (German: Wahlkreis) represented in the Bundestag. It elects one member via first-past-the-post voting. Under the current constituency numbering system, it is designated as constituency 75. It is located in central Berlin, comprising the Mitte borough.

Berlin-Mitte was created for the 2002 federal election. Since 2021, it has been represented by Hanna Steinmüller of the Alliance 90/The Greens.

Geography 
Berlin-Mitte is located in central Berlin. As of the 2021 federal election, it is coterminous with the Mitte borough.

History 
Berlin-Mitte was created in 2002 and contained parts of the abolished constituencies of Berlin-Tiergarten – Wedding – Nord-Charlottenburg and Berlin-Mitte – Prenzlauer Berg. In the 2002 through 2009 elections, it was constituency 76 in the numbering system. Since the 2013 election, it has been number 75. Its borders have not changed since its creation.

Members 
The constituency was first represented by Jörg-Otto Spiller of the Social Democratic Party (SPD) from 2002 to 2009. Eva Högl was elected in 2009, and re-elected in 2013 and 2017. She resigned in May 2020 after being appointed Parliamentary Commissioner for the Armed Forces. Hanna Steinmüller won the constituency for the Greens in 2021.

Election results

2021 election

2017 election

2013 election

2009 election

References 

Mitte
Mitte
2002 establishments in Germany
Constituencies established in 2002